Talcopsaltria is a genus of cicadas in the family Cicadidae. There is at least one described species in Talcopsaltria, T. olivei, found in Australia,  in Queensland. The genus was first described in 2008 by Maxwell Sydney Moulds.

References

Further reading

 
 
 

Cicadinae
Cicadidae genera